Narender Singh may refer to:

 Narender Pal Singh (born 1973), Indian cricketer for Hyderabad
 Narender Singh (Delhi cricketer) (born 1987), Indian cricketer
 Narender Singh (judoka) (1969–2016), Indian judoka
 Narender Singh Yadav (born 1994), Indian mountaineer